The Citroën Xsara WRC is a World Rally Car built for the Citroën World Rally Team by Citroën Racing to compete in the World Rally Championship. It is based upon the Citroën Xsara road car. The car was introduced for the 2001 World Rally Championship season and has taken first three of nine drivers' titles for Sébastien Loeb, as well as the manufacturers' title in 2003, 2004, and 2005.

Competition history

World Rally Championship

The Xsara World Rally Car, based on the road going Xsara hatchback but ultimately having very little resemblance to it under the skin, was one of the most successful cars ever to compete in the World Rally Championship. In 1999, the WRCs predecessor, the two wheel drive naturally aspirated Xsara Kit Car, won overall in Rallye Catalunya and Tour de Corse. 

This car was considered the best car in the class. The late Philippe Bugalski placed seventh overall and won the Kit Car F2 class.

In 2001, Kit Cars category disappeared and was replaced by Super 1600 and Super 2000. Citroën Xsara competed in the category of World Rally Car. In 2002, French driver Sébastien Loeb was supposed to win the Monte Carlo Rally but he was penalized for an illegal tyre change, but he later won the Deutschland Rally.

In 2003, the Citroën Xsara was more competitive. In Wales GB, the leader Richard Burns suffered a blackout and withdrew from the rally. Sébastien Loeb made some mistakes on the last round and he lost the championship by just one point. However, the Citroën won the manufacturers' title. In 2004, Sébastien Loeb won the championship.

Sébastien Loeb won 28 rallies with the car, three consecutive Driver's Championship titles from 2004 to 2006, and Citroën to three consecutive Manufacturer's Championship titles in 2003, 2004, and 2005. In addition to Leob piloting the Xsara WRC, Jesús Puras, Carlos Sainz, and François Duval have also driven it to win since its 2001 conception.

The car was replaced in 2007 by the Citroën C4 WRC, however the Xsara was still used by privateers and others. World champion of 2003, Petter Solberg drove a 2006 spec Xsara for the majority of the season of 2009, which was entered by his own Petter Solberg World Rally Team.

Rallycross
Kenneth Hansen won the FIA European Rallycross Championship every year from 2000 to 2005.

In September 2014, French based Lebanese businessman Nabil Karam entered the 2014 World RX of France with an Xsara, finishing 34th out of 37 entrants after the qualifying heats, and failing to qualify for the semi finals. Having upgraded to a DS3 for the edition of 2015, this is the only time an Xsara has been used in a FIA World Rallycross Championship event.

WRC victories

WRC results

References

External links

 

World Rally Cars
Xsara WRC
All-wheel-drive vehicles
World Rally championship-winning cars